Woolwich station may refer to:

Transport
Woolwich railway station, on the Elizabeth line in south east London, United Kingdom
Woolwich Arsenal station, a National Rail and Docklands Light Railway interchange in south east London
Woolwich Dockyard railway station, a National Rail station in south east London

Other uses
Woolwich Fire Station in south east London
Woolwich Power Station in south east London